NYPL or N.Y.P.L. may refer to:

 New York–Penn League, a minor baseball league in the northeastern United States
 New York Public Library, a public library system in New York City